Samuel Sherwin (1813–1899) was an architect  and building contractor who worked in Boston in Lincolnshire.  His father was Dix Sherwin, a ship's chandler. In October 1849, he was apprenticed to William Stainton of Boston, builder, for the term of six years, in the "art or profession of an architect". Sherwin is often referred to as a builder, but the existence of architectural plans signed  by him show that he was also a practising architect.

Architectural work
 No15 Market Place Boston (c. 1880). Nationwide Building Society. Originally Small's drapers shop. Described by Pevsner as "commercial Gothic with mullioned and transomed windows, triplets  of lancets above in single blind arches and little triplets in the gables".  A four-storey building with a brick frontage with stone dressings. Sherwin has ingeniously splayed the corners of the facade to admit more light.

Work as a building contractor
Shodfriars Hall, Boston.  Sherwin acquired this historic medieval building in 1874 and  commissioned  George Gilbert Scott Jnr. and John Oldrid Scott to advise on the restoration of the building. To the rear of the building a new public hall and Conservative club was built to the Scotts' designs in a German Brick Gothic revival style. 
 New Gasworks for the Lincoln Gas Company, Bracebridge (1875). The principal contractors included Samuel Sherwin of Boston, who built the gas holder tanks, processing tanks and retort house.

Literature
 Antram N (revised), Pevsner N & Harris J, (1989), The Buildings of England: Lincolnshire, Yale University Press.
Minnis J., Carmichael K. & Fletcher C. (2015) Boston, Lincolnshire: Historic North Sea Port and Market Town, English Heritage, .

References

External links

19th-century English architects
Architects from Lincolnshire
1813 births
1899 deaths
People from Boston, Lincolnshire